IEN or ien or variation, may refer to:

People
Marci Ien (born 1969), Canadian politician
Ien Ang (born 1954), Australian professor
Ien Chi (born 1991), Korean-American filmmaker
Ien Dales (1931–1994), Dutch politician
Ien van den Heuvel (1927–2010), Dutch politician
Ien Lucas (born 1955), Dutch artist

Organizations
Indigenous Environmental Network
Irish Environmental Network

Publications
Internet Experiment Note
Industrial Engineering News group of magazines
Industrial Engineering News Europe
Industrial Engineering News Italia

Other uses
Interrupt ENable flip-flop

See also

 Iens, Friesland, Netherlands
 
 Ian (disambiguation)
 Ion (disambiguation)